Group B of the 2012 Fed Cup Asia/Oceania Zone Group II was one of two pools in the Asia/Oceania zone of the 2012 Fed Cup. Five teams competed in a round robin competition, with the teams proceeding to their respective sections of the play-offs: the top team played for advancement to the 2013 Group I.

India vs. Iran

Turkmenistan vs. Oman

Philippines vs. Iran

India vs. Oman

Philippines vs. Oman

India vs. Turkmenistan

Philippines vs. Turkmenistan

Oman vs. Iran

Philippines vs. India

Turkmenistan vs. Iran

References

External links
 Fed Cup website

2012 Fed Cup Asia/Oceania Zone